Heringia verrucula is a European species of hoverfly.

Description

Habits

Distribution

References

Diptera of Europe
Pipizinae
Insects described in 1931